In fiber optics, a reconfigurable optical add-drop multiplexer (ROADM) is a form of optical add-drop multiplexer that adds the ability to remotely switch traffic from a wavelength-division multiplexing (WDM) system at the wavelength layer. This is achieved through the use of a wavelength selective switching module. This allows individual or multiple wavelengths carrying data channels to be added and/or dropped from a transport fiber without the need to convert the signals on all of the WDM channels to electronic signals and back again to optical signals.

The main advantages of the ROADM are:
 The planning of entire bandwidth assignment need not be carried out during initial deployment of a system. The configuration can be done as and when required without affecting traffic already passing the ROADM.
 ROADM allows for remote configuration and reconfiguration.
 In ROADM, as it is not clear beforehand where a signal can be potentially routed, there is a necessity of power balancing of these signals. ROADMs allow for automatic power balancing.

ROADM functionality originally appeared in long-haul dense wavelength division multiplexing (DWDM) equipment, but by 2005, it began to appear in metro optical systems because of the need to build out major metropolitan networks in order to deal with the traffic driven by the increasing demand for packet-based services.

The switching or reconfiguration functions of a ROADM can be achieved using a variety of switching technologies including microelectromechanical systems (MEMS), liquid crystal, thermo optic and beam-steering switches in planar waveguide circuits, and tunable optical filter technology.

See also 
 Optical mesh network

References 
 Light Reading's Heavy Reading - "ROADMs and the Future of Metro Optical Networks", May 2005
 South-East Europe Fibre Infrastructure for Research and Education - Dark Fibre Lighting Technologies

Telecommunications equipment